The 2019 Southeast Missouri State Redhawks football team represented Southeast Missouri State University as a member of the Ohio Valley Conference (OVC) during the 2019 NCAA Division I FCS football season. Led by sixth-year head coach Tom Matukewicz, the Redhawks compiled an overall record of 9–4 with a mark of 7–1 in conference play, sharing the OVC title with Austin Peay. Southeast Missouri State received an at-large bid to the NCAA Division I Football Championship playoffs, where the Redhawks lost to Illinois State in the first round. The team played home games at Houck Stadium in Cape Girardeau, Missouri.

Previous season

The Redhawks finished the 2018 season 9–4, 6–2 in OVC play to finish in second place. They received an at-large bid to the FCS playoffs, where they defeated Stony Brook in the first round before losing in the second round to Weber State.

Preseason

Preseason coaches' poll
The OVC released their preseason coaches' poll on July 22, 2019. The Redhawks were picked to finish in second place.

Preseason All-OVC team
The Redhawks had six players at five positions selected to the preseason all-OVC team.

Offense

Daniel Santacaterina – QB

Kristian Wilkerson – WR

Defense

Clarence Thornton – DL

Zach Hall – LB

Justin Swift – LB

Bydarrius Knighten – DB

Schedule

Game summaries

Southern Illinois

at Montana State

at Missouri

West Virginia State

Tennessee Tech

at Austin Peay

at Jacksonville State

UT Martin

at Tennessee State

Eastern Kentucky

at Eastern Illinois

Murray State

Illinois State–NCAA Division I First Round
The Redhawks received an at-large bid to the NCAA Division I Football Championship playoffs, with a first-round pairing against Illinois State.

Ranking movements

References

Southeast Missouri State
Southeast Missouri State Redhawks football seasons
Ohio Valley Conference football champion seasons
Southeast Missouri State
Southeast Missouri State Redhawks football